Mingoville is an unincorporated community and census-designated place (CDP) in Walker Township, Centre County, Pennsylvania, United States. As of the 2010 census, the population was 503 residents.

Mingoville is located in eastern Centre County, west of the center of Walker Township, in the Nittany Valley between Nittany Mountain to the southeast and Sand Ridge to the northwest.

Demographics

References

Census-designated places in Centre County, Pennsylvania
Census-designated places in Pennsylvania